Honesto Flores Ongtioco (born 17 October 1948) is a Filipino bishop of the Roman Catholic Church. He is the first and only Bishop of Cubao, and also served as Apostolic Administrator of the Diocese of Malolos from May 12, 2018 to August 21, 2019. He had previously served as Bishop of Balanga in Bataan from June 18, 1998 to August 28, 2003.

Early life and education
Honesto Flores Ongtioco was born on October 17, 1948, at San Fernando, Pampanga. He studied elementary at St. Scholastica's Academy and high school at Don Bosco Academy. In 1958, he had seminary training at San Jose Seminary. Three years after studying philosophy in 1964, he took theology at the Loyola School of Theology in Ateneo de Manila University. Ongtioco earned a master's degree in Organization Development and Planning in 1983 at the Southeast Asian Interdisciplinary Development Institute in Manila.

In 1984, he went to the United States to take renewal courses on Liturgy and Spirituality at St. John's University in New York City. After taking renewal courses, he went to Rome in 1987 where he obtained a licentiate in Sacred Theology from the Pontifical University of Saint Thomas Aquinas.

Ministry

Priesthood (1972–1998)
On December 8, 1972, Ongtioco was ordained to the priesthood by Bishop Emilio Cinense y Abera, Bishop of San Fernando at the Cathedral of Our Lady of the Assumption.

After his ordination, Ongtioco was given several assignments in San Fernando. He served as spiritual director, professor, rector, and other positions in Mother of Good Counsel Minor Seminary, University of the Assumption, and other educational institutions. He was also appointed as parochial vicar of the Holy Rosary Parish in Angeles City from 1974 to 1975 and in St. Peter and Paul Parish from 1975 to 1977.

On March 21, 1992, Ongtioco was invested as honorary prelate. Five years later, he was appointed as rector of the Pontificio Collegio Filippino in Rome, Italy.

Bishop (1998–present)
Ongtioco was appointed as the second Bishop of Balanga on April 8, 1998 by Pope John Paul II and was installed on June 18 of that same year. On June 28, 2003, he was appointed as the first bishop of Cubao by the same pope and was installed on August 28 of that year, the same day the new diocese was canonically erected.

Due to the death of Bishop José F. Oliveros, the fourth bishop of Malolos, on May 11, 2018, Pope Francis appointed him as the Apostolic Administrator of the diocese on May 16, 2018. As per No. 244 of the Apostolorum Successores or Directory of Pastoral Ministry of Bishops, Ongtioco holds “all the faculties and rights to exercise the office of a diocesan bishop.”  He ceased being Apostolic Administrator of the diocese on August 21, 2019 upon the installation of Dennis Cabanada Villarojo, the fifth bishop of Malolos.

On July 19, 2019, the PNP–Criminal Investigation and Detection Group (CIDG) filed charges against Ongtioco and members of the opposition for "sedition, cyber libel, libel, estafa, harboring a criminal, and obstruction of justice".

Coat of arms

References

External links

1948 births
Living people
20th-century Roman Catholic bishops in the Philippines
21st-century Roman Catholic bishops in the Philippines
Filipino people of Chinese descent
Kapampangan people
People from San Fernando, Pampanga
Ateneo de Manila University alumni
Bishops appointed by Pope John Paul II